Chism is a surname. Notable people with the surname include:

Cameron Chism (born 1990), American football player
Tina Gordon Chism, American screenwriter and film director
Tom Chism (born 1955), American baseball player
Wayne Chism (born 1987), American basketball player
Philip Chism (born 1999), American student, the killer of Colleen Ritzer